KRKA (103.9 FM) is a Worship Music formatted radio station licensed to Severance, Colorado, United States. The station serves the Ft. Collins - Greeley area. The station is owned by the Educational Media Foundation and broadcasts the company's Air 1 Christian Worship format.

References

External links

Air1 radio stations
Radio stations established in 2008
2008 establishments in Colorado
Educational Media Foundation radio stations
RKA